Didazoon haoae is an extinct species of vetulicolid vetulicolian described by Shu, et al. based on fossils found in the Qiongzhusi (Chiungchussu) Formation, Yu'anshan Member (Eoredlichia zone), Lower Cambrian, in the Dabanqiao area (Kunming), about 60 km northwest of Chengjiang, China.

The fossils show that the body of the animal was covered in a thin, flexible cuticle. The anterior part of the body was divided into six segments, with fairly broad membranes separating the segments, and the posterior part of the body was divided into seven segments. The constriction between the anterior and posterior parts of the animal shows creasing, and the authors hypothesize that it was quite flexible. The fossils are interpreted as showing a large anterior opening, presumably a mouth, a spacious anterior cavity, an alimentary canal, possibly voluminous in the anterior section, and a narrow intestine in the posterior section, straight or coiled (in one specimen). There are five structures on each side of the anterior portion that the authors interpret as gills. Narrow strands towards the lateral margins, sometimes branched, may represent vascular tissue. The authors also identify a dark strand on the lower interior surface of the anterior section, which they speculate is an endostyle.

See also

 Maotianshan shales

References

Animals described in 2001
Maotianshan shales fossils
Monotypic vertebrate genera
Prehistoric vertebrate genera
Vetulicolia